Aşağı Güzlək (also, Ashagy Gyuzlyak, Kyuzlyak, and Yukhary Gyuzlyak) is a village in the Fuzuli District of Azerbaijan.

References 

Populated places in Fuzuli District